Texas caviar, also called cowboy caviar, is a bean salad consisting of black-eyed peas lightly pickled in a vinaigrette-style dressing, often eaten as a dip accompaniment to tortilla chips.

History
Texas caviar was created in the U.S. state of Texas around 1940 by Helen Corbitt, a native New Yorker who later became director of food service for the Zodiac Room at Neiman Marcus in Dallas, Texas. She first served the dish on New Year's Eve at the Houston Country Club. When she later served it at the Driskill Hotel in Austin, Texas, it was given its name, "Texas caviar," as a humorous comparison to true caviar, an expensive hors d'oeuvre of salt-cured fish roe.

Variations
In addition to black-eyed peas and a piquant dressing, the dip can be modified by adding black beans, alliums like red onion, scallions, and garlic, hot or mild peppers, tomato, cilantro, corn, and spices like cumin and coriander.

See also
 Hoppin' John, a black-eyed pea dish served for good luck on New Year's Eve, as Texas caviar originally was

References 

Salads
Legume dishes
Vegetable dishes
Vegetarian cuisine
Vegan cuisine
Tex-Mex cuisine
Texan cuisine
Cuisine of the Southwestern United States
Texas culture
Dips (food)